Grewia insularis  is a species of flowering plant in the Malvaceae, or mallow family, that is endemic to Christmas Island, an Australian territory in the north-eastern Indian Ocean.  Its specific epithet is the Latin for insular, referring to its island location.

Description
Grewia insularis is a shrub or small tree.  Its leaves are oblong to ovate, 40–110 mm long.  The yellow flowers are usually 1–3 in an umbel, often with several umbels from one leaf-axil.  The fruit is purple, often reduced to a subglobose drupe about 3 mm long.

Distribution and habitat
Found only on Christmas Island, it occurs on the terraces on the northern coast.

Relationships
The fruit and flowers of G. insularis are similar to those of G. glabra, while the shape of its leaves closely resemble those of G. eriocarpa.

References

Notes

Sources
 
 

insularis
Endemic flora of Christmas Island
Malvales of Australia
Plants described in 1906
Taxa named by Henry Nicholas Ridley